Grecia may refer to:
 Greece, in several Romance languages (Latin: Graecia)
 Grecia (canton) (Spanish: Cantón de Grecia), third canton of the Costa Rican province of Alajuela
 Grecia, Costa Rica, its capital city located in the first district (Distrito de Grecia)
 Grecia (toucan), the first toucan to receive a prosthetic 3D printed beak

See also
Greece (disambiguation)